Rivka Michaeli (born 14 April 1938) is an Israeli actress, comedian, television hostess, and entertainer.

Early life
Michaeli was born in Jerusalem, British Mandate of Palestine (now Israel). Her father's family is of Georgian-Jewish descent, whereas her mother comes from the Rivlin family and of Austrian-Jewish descent. Michaeli attended the Hebrew University Secondary School.

Career
By age 14, she was singing on Israel Radio. Michaeli performed her military service at the Army Radio.

In the 1960s, her first show on stage was with Yossi Banai. She met future composer and Israel Prize recipient Ehud Manor in the 1960s, when she was emceeing the dance troupe of The Hebrew University of Jerusalem, and he applied to join the troupe. Impressed by his musical knowledge, she contacted Israel Radio, which offered him a job editing musical programs, and ultimately accepted a number of songs he produced for broadcast.

In 1974 she was part of the cast of the satirical program Nikui Rosh ("Head Cleaning"). Subsequently, she was the host of Siba L'mesiba ("Reason for a Party"), the most popular television program broadcast on Friday evenings, as well as its successor, "Sof Shavua" ("Weekend").

She also performed at the Habimah and Cameri theaters, acted in a television series, and appeared in 16 films, broadcast on radio, recorded albums, moderated song festivals, and twice hosted Eurovision. She was awarded a prize for her life's work by the Israeli Film and Television Academy, and also a prize for her contribution to radio.

In 1991, The Los Angeles Times called her: "one of Israel's most popular television hosts", and in 1995 The Jerusalem Post called her "one of the country's most popular entertainers".

References

External links

Living people
Israeli stage actresses
Israeli female comedians
Israeli television presenters
Israeli women television presenters
Israeli entertainers
People from Jerusalem
Israeli Ashkenazi Jews
Israeli people of Austrian-Jewish descent
Israeli people of Georgian-Jewish descent
1938 births
Israeli radio presenters
Israeli women radio presenters
Israeli film actresses
Israeli television actresses
Israeli radio actresses
20th-century Israeli actresses